The Cambodia national badminton team represents Cambodia in international badminton team competitions. It is controlled by the Cambodia Badminton Federation (Khmer: សហព័ន្ធកីឡាវាយសីកម្ពុជា). Cambodia have never competed in any BWF organized team tournaments.

The Cambodian junior badminton squad competed in the Badminton Asia Junior Championships mixed team event in 2009 and 2010. Cambodia also competes in badminton at the Badminton at the Southeast Asian Games but have yet to win a medal in the team events.

History 
Badminton was introduced to Cambodia in the 1950s and the national team was formed shortly after the formation of Cambodia Badminton Federation in 1958. Cambodia has had weak results in badminton compared to its Southeast Asian neighbors. They've yet to win a medal in badminton at the Southeast Asian Games but did however win a bronze medal in mixed doubles at the 1971 Asian Badminton Championships when the country was under civil war.

In 2022, the Cambodian team hired South Korean coach Choi Seung-kook as preparation for the 2023 Southeast Asian Games. In 2023, the Cambodia Badminton Federation received backlash for banning the national teams of Indonesia, Malaysia, Thailand, Singapore and Vietnam from competing in the mixed team event at the 2023 Southeast Asian Games.

Men's team 
Cambodia sent a total of 4 players to debut at the 2007 Southeast Asian Games men's team event. The team lost 0-3 to Malaysia. Cambodia then lost to Thailand in the quarter-finals at the 2009 and 2011 Southeast Asian Games. Cambodia lost to Malaysia again at the 2015 Southeast Asian Games. In 2017, the team lost to Indonesia 0-3 and then lost to Thailand again at the 2019 Southeast Asian Games.

Women's team 
The Cambodian women's team were scheduled to debut and compete against Malaysia in the quarter-finals at the 2019 Southeast Asian Games but withdrew without any reason given from the national federation.

Competitive record

SEA Games

Men's team

Women's team

Junior competitive record

Asian Junior Team Championships

Mixed team

ASEAN School Games

Boys' team

Girls' team

Staff 
The following list shows the coaching staff for the Cambodian national badminton team.

Players

Current squad

Men's team

Women's team

References 

Badminton
National badminton teams